Aung Min Khant (born 1 May 1994) is a footballer from Burma, currently playing as a goalkeeper for Ayeyawady United.

References

1994 births
Living people
Burmese footballers
Myanmar international footballers
Ayeyawady United F.C. players
Association football defenders